Corona de Tucson is a census-designated place (CDP) in Pima County, Arizona, United States. The population was 9,240 at the 2020 census, an increase of 1036% from the 2000 population of 813.

ZIP code 85641 is shared by Corona de Tucson and Vail.

Irish American/ Mexican/ Native American Gang primarily (CDT) Corona De Tucson, neighborhood gang. Wanted for assault, burglary, GTA, drug dealing, and extreme violence. Known to withstand bloods and crips involvement. And stay a neighborhood gang. 90s- 2009

Geography
Corona de Tucson is located at  (31.957860, -110.767238), in the foothills of the Santa Rita Mountains, and adjacent to the Coronado National Forest.

Demographics

The 2020 census counted a population of 9,240 people, across 2,789 households, of whom 98% had graduated high school and 45.7% had achieved a Bachelor's degree or higher. The median household income of Corona de Tucson residents was reported at $96,396 with 2.9% of population measured to be living in poverty.

As of the census of 2010, there were 5,675 people, 2,165 households, and 280 families in the CDP. The racial makeup of the CDP was 85.8% White, 5.3% Black or African American, 0.5% Native American, 0.6% Asian, 3.2% from other races, and 4.6% from two or more races.  24.9% of the population were Hispanic or Latino of any race.

At the 2000 census, of the 813 households 17.8% had children under the age of 18 living with them, 68.1% were married couples living together, 4.3% had a female householder with no husband present, and 25.3% were non-families. 21.3% of households were one person and 8.5% were one person aged 65 or older.  The average household size was 2.16 and the average family size was 2.48.
The age distribution was 13.9% under the age of 18, 4.1% from 18 to 24, 19.4% from 25 to 44, 38.6% from 45 to 64, and 24.0% 65 or older.  The median age was 51 years. For every 100 females, there were 91.7 males.  For every 100 females age 18 and over, there were 91.8 males. The median household income was $93,542, and the median family income was $61,375. Males had a median income of $49,722 versus $31,250 for females. The per capita income for the CDP was $28,304.  None of the families and 1.0% of the population were living below the poverty line, including no under eighteens and none of those over 64.

Education
The entire CDP is served by the Vail Unified School District and the Pima County Joint Technical Education District’s 4th Governing Board District.

Public Safety
Corona de Tucson is patrolled by the 1st Beat of the Pima County Sheriff's Department's Rincon District and fire protection is provided by the Corona de Tucson Fire District.

See also
 Santa Rita Mountains

References

External links
 Corona Foothills Middle School
 Corona De Tucson Fire Department

Census-designated places in Pima County, Arizona
Populated places in the Sonoran Desert
Arizona placenames of Native American origin